Qiaocheng East station, formerly Qiaochengdong station, is a station on Line 1 of the Shenzhen Metro. It opened on 28 December 2004. It is located underground at Shennan Dadao, west of Qiaochengdong Lu and east of Xiaoshahe Lu, in Futian District, Shenzhen, China. It is near the east end of Splendid China Folk Village and Overseas Chinese Town, hence its name.

Station layout

Exits

See also 
Overseas Chinese Town

References

External links

 Shenzhen Metro Qiaocheng East Station (Chinese)
 Shenzhen Metro Qiaocheng East Station (English)
 

Railway stations in Guangdong
Shenzhen Metro stations
Futian District
Railway stations in China opened in 2004
Railway stations located underground in China